GNOME Keyring is a software application designed to store security credentials such as usernames, passwords, and keys, together with a small amount of relevant metadata. The sensitive data is encrypted and stored in a keyring file in the user's home directory. The default keyring uses the login password for encryption, so users don't need to remember another password.

As of 2009, GNOME Keyring was part of the desktop environment in the operating system OpenSolaris.

GNOME Keyring is implemented as a daemon and uses the process name gnome-keyring-daemon. Applications can store and request passwords by using the
libsecret library which replaces the deprecated libgnome-keyring library.

GNOME Keyring is part of the GNOME desktop. As of 2006, it integrated with NetworkManager to store WEP passwords. GNOME Web and the email client Geary uses GNOME Keyring to store passwords.

In 2009, a statistical study of software packages in the Red Hat Linux distribution found that packages depending upon GNOME Keyring (and therefore integrated somewhat with the GNOME desktop environment) were less likely to be associated with software vulnerabilities than those with a dependency upon kdelibs (and therefore integrated somewhat with the KDE desktop environment).

On systems where GNOME Keyring is present, software written in Vala can use it to store and retrieve passwords. The GNOME Keyring Manager (gnome-keyring-manager) was the first user interface for the GNOME Keyring. As of GNOME 2.22, it is deprecated and replaced entirely with Seahorse.

See also

 KWallet, the KDE equivalent
 Apple Keychain
 NetworkManager
 Seahorse (software)
 Linux on the desktop
 List of password managers
 Password manager
 Cryptography

References

External links
 GNOME Keyring Wikipage on wiki.gnome.org
 GNOME Keyring git on git.gnome.org
 gnome-keyring Security Philosophy

Free password managers
Free software programmed in C
GNOME